Clement Tirkey is the current serving bishop of the Roman Catholic Diocese of Jalpaiguri, India.

Early life 
Tirkey was born in Chhattisgarh, India on 12 September 1947.

Priesthood 
Tirkey was ordained a priest in 1978 for the Darjeeling diocese but was incardinated in Bagdogra diocese on 14 June 1997.

Episcopate 
Tirkey was appointed bishop of Jalpaiguri on 31 January 2006 and consecrated on 23 April 2006 by Cardinal Telesphore Toppo.

References 

1947 births
Living people
21st-century Roman Catholic bishops in India